Karanas are the 108 key transitions in the classical Indian dance described in 4th Chapter named "Tandava Lakshana" of Natya Shastra. Karana is a Sanskrit verbal noun, meaning "doing".

Description

Natya Shastra states that Karanas are the framework for the "margi" (pan-Indian classical) productions which are supposed to spiritually enlighten the spectators, as opposed to the "desi" (regional folk or pop dance) productions which can only entertain the spectators. "One who performs well this Karana dance created by Maheswara will go free from all sins to the abode of this deity," states Natya Shastra

Some of the well-known interpretations of karanas are by Dr.Padma Subramanyam that were based on 108 brief movement phrases describing specific leg, hip, body, and arm movements accompanied by hasta mudras described in the Natya shastra and other scriptures, and from depictions of the movements in sculpture in five South Indian temples, notably the Chidambaram temple which contains depictions of the full set. Dr. Padma Subrahmanyam has written a book called Karanas-Common dance codes of India and Indonesia, based on her research of karanas from the temples of Prambanan(Indonesia), Thanjavur, Kumbakonam, Chidambaram, Thiruvannamalai, and Vriddhachalam. In the 20th century, she was the first dancer to reconstruct the Karanas as movements, which were considered mere poses earlier.

Some other Bharatanatyam gurus, such as Adyar Lakshman (Kalakshetra school), as well as the Kuchipudi gurus Vempati Chinna Satyam and C.R.Acharya have also attempted to reconstruct all the 108 karanas, which were often significantly different from Padma Subrahmanyam's interpretations so much so that even on the chari (leg movement) level there was no agreement as to whose interpretation is correct.  Due to the significant variations in the depictions, most traditional Bharatanatyam schools considered Padma Subrahmanyam's style, which incorporated Karanas as incorrect, which forced her to name her own style as Bharatanrityam rather than Bharatanatyam. Many of Padma Subrahmanyam's disciples, such as Bala Devi Chandrashekar (SPNAPA Academy of performing arts) - Sujatha Mohan (Padmashree Nrithyalaya), Uma Sriram, Jayashree Rajagopalan, Dominique Delorme (France) and others are teaching the 108 karanas based on Dr. Padma's research.
 
There used to be devadasis who performed all the 108 karanas. Still, now in most contemporary Bharatanatyam or Odissi schools, only a small number of karanas and their derivatives have been transmitted by parampara up to date.

Apart from that, performing of the same Karana differs greatly across different classical Indian styles. Currently, as regards the exact technique, there are no established standards and no universally agreed-upon interpretations of the texts and sculptures.

List of 108 Karanas

 Talapuṣpapuṭam
 Vartitam
 Valitōrukam
 Apaviddam
 Samanakam
 Līnam
 Swastikarēchitam
 Manḍalaswastikam
 Nikuṭṭakam
 Ardhanikuṭṭam
 Kaṭīchinnam
 Ardharēchitam
 Vakśaswastikam
 Unmattam
 Swastikam
 Pṛṣṭhaswastikam
 Dikswastikam
 Alātam
 Kaṭīsamam
 Ākśiptarēchitam
 Vikśiptākśiptam
 Ardhaswastikam
 Añchitam
 Bhujaṅgatrāsitam
 Ūrdhvajānu
 Nikuñchitam
 Mattalli
 Ardhamattalli
 Rēchitanikuṭṭam
 Pādāpaviddakam
 Valitam
 Gūrṇitam
 Lalitam
 Daṇḍapakśam
 Bhujaṅgatrastarēchitam
 Nūpuram
 Vaiṣākharēchitam
 Bhramaram
 Chaturam
 Bhujaṅgāñchitam
 Daṇḍarēchitam
 Vṛśchikakuṭṭitam
 Kaṭībhrāntam
 Latāvṛśchikam
 Chinnam
 Vṛśchikarēchitam
 Vṛśchikam
 Vyamsitam
 Pārśvanikuṭṭakam
 Lalāṭatilakam
 Krāntam
 Kuñchitam
 Chakramaṇḍalam
 Urōmaṇḍalam
 Ākśiptam
 Talavilāsitam
 Argaḷam
 Vikṣiptam
 Āvartam
 Dōlāpādam
 Vivṛttam
 Vinivṛttam
 Pārśvakrāntam
 Niṣumbhitam
 Vidyutbhrāntam
 Atikrāntam
 Vivartitakam
 Gajakrīḍitam
 Talasamsphoṭitam
 Garuḍaplutam
 Gaṇḍasūchī
 Parīvṛttam
 Pārśvajānu
 Gṛdrāvalīnakam
 Sannatam
 Sūchī
 Ardhasūchī
 Sūchīviddham
 Apakrāntam
 Mayūralalitam
 Sarpitam
 Danḍapādam
 Harinaplutam
 Prēnkōlitam
 Nitambam
 Skalitam
 Karihastam
 Prasarpitam
 Simhavikrīḍitam
 Simhākarṣitam
 Udvṛttam
 Upaśṛtam
 Talasaṅghaṭṭitam
 Janitam
 Avahittakam
 Nivēśam
 Ēlakākrīditam
 Ūrūdvṛttam
 Madaskalitam
 Viṣṇukrāntam
 Sambhrāntam
 Viśkhambam
 Udghaṭṭitam
 Vṛśabhakrīḍitam
 Lōlitam
 Nāgāpasarpitam
 Śakaṭāsyam
 Gaṅgāvataranam

See also

 Kuchipudi

References

External links
 Padma Subrahmanyam, "Bharatha Natyam - Classical Dance of the Ancient Tamils.  The Role of Dance Sculptures in Tamilnad (1968) P. Subrahmanyam's introduction, with pictures illustrating 108 karanas.

Dances of India
Ritual dances
Bharatanatyam